Jack Ingram (December 28, 1936 – June 25, 2021) was an American NASCAR Busch Series race car driver. Nicknamed the "Iron Man", during eight seasons in the Busch Series, he won 31 races and 5 poles, as well as the 1982 and 1985 championships. Unlike most younger competitors, Ingram won his 31 races between the age of 45 and age 50.

Career
During most of his time in the series he drove the Skoal Bandit car (1984–1991). Throughout his Busch Series career he almost always raced in the No. 11 car. During the 1986 season, Ingram was suspended for two races by NASCAR after ramming a driver during a race in Asheville, North Carolina at the New Asheville Speedway.

Jack Ingram got his start at the New Asheville Speedway, and there he was a marquee driver along with rival Bob Pressley.

After his NBS retirement in 1991, he held the record for the most wins in the Busch Series, until it was broken by Mark Martin in 1997. As of August 17, 2019, he is currently 6th in career wins in the series.

Prior to the inauguration of the Busch Series in 1982 Ingram had won three consecutive Late Model Sportsman Championships in 1972, 1973 and 1974.

In 2007, Ingram was inducted into the International Motorsports Hall of Fame.

In 2013, Ingram was nominated into the NASCAR Hall of Fame, and was inducted the following year.

Death
Ingram died on June 25, 2021, at the age of 84.

Motorsports career results

NASCAR
(key) (Bold – Pole position awarded by qualifying time. Italics – Pole position earned by points standings or practice time. * – Most laps led.)

Grand National Series

Winston Cup Series

Daytona 500

Busch Series

ARCA Talladega SuperCar Series
(key) (Bold – Pole position awarded by qualifying time. Italics – Pole position earned by points standings or practice time. * – Most laps led.)

References

External links
 
 

1936 births
2021 deaths
American Speed Association drivers
International Motorsports Hall of Fame inductees
NASCAR drivers
NASCAR Xfinity Series champions
Sportspeople from Asheville, North Carolina
Racing drivers from North Carolina
ARCA Menards Series drivers
NASCAR Hall of Fame inductees